This article lists the winners and nominees for the Black Reel Award for Television for Outstanding Supporting Actor, Drama Series. This category was first introduced in 2017 and won by Ron Cephas Jones for This Is Us. Giancarlo Esposito currently holds the record for most nominations in this category with five.

Winners and nominees
Winners are listed first and highlighted in bold.

2010s

2020s

Superlatives

Programs with multiple awards

Performers with multiple awards

Programs with multiple nominations

3 nominations
 Queen Sugar

2 nominations
 Bel-Air
 Better Call Saul
 Godfather of Harlem
 Scandal
 This Is Us
 Westworld

Performers with multiple nominations

5 nominations
 Giancarlo Esposito

3 nominations 
 Joe Morton

2 nominations
 Jeffrey Wright

Total awards by network
 HBO - 2
 CBS - 1
 EPIX - 1
 NBC - 1
 OWN - 1

References

Black Reel Awards